State Highway 45 (Andhra Pradesh) is a state highway in the Indian state of Andhra Pradesh

Route 

It starts at SH 2 junction near Piduguralla and passes through Chilakaluripet, Narasaraopeta and ends at Chirala.

See also 
 List of state highways in Andhra Pradesh

References 

State Highways in Andhra Pradesh
Roads in Guntur district
Roads in Prakasam district